Bradley Wilson-Dean (born 26 October 1994) is a New Zealand speedway rider.

Career
Wilson-Dean began riding speedway at the age of 12 in New Zealand and progressed to riding 500cc machines in 2011 when he was 15.  The same year he rode in The FIM Speedway Youth Gold Trophy in Norrköping where he placed 4th.

In 2015 he joined the Eastbourne Eagles in the National League.  He achieved a 9.83 average for the season and was the team's top scorer.    The following year Wilson-Dean rode for the Somerset Rebels in the middle  tier of British Speedway and in 2017 he rode in the top tier for the Swindon Robins.  In 2017 he also rode for the Peterborough Panthers in the second division.   In 2018 he rejoined the Somerset Rebels when they moved up to the SGB Premiership, and in 2019 he rode for the Peterborough Panthers in the Premiership.  He was injured midway through the 2019 season and returned to New Zealand to recuperate.  In 2020 he signed for the Somerset Rebels and the Peterborough Panthers but had to withdraw before the season began due to injury.   In 2022 he joined the Newcastle Diamonds but only rode in three meetings before being sidelined with injury.. He had also signed for the second league Polish team, Kolejarz Rawicz but didn't ride in any meetings because of injury.

He is a four times New Zealand Champion (2017-2021).

References 

1994 births
Living people
New Zealand speedway riders
Peterborough Panthers riders
Poole Pirates riders
Somerset Rebels riders
Workington Comets riders